Leptostylus latifasciatus is a species of beetle in the family Cerambycidae. It was described by Zayasd in 1975.

References

Leptostylus
Beetles described in 1975